Leonardo Tavares and Simone Vagnozzi were the defending champions, but only Tavares chose to play this year.
As a result, he partnered up with Frederico Gil. They lost to Martin Emmrich and Andreas Siljeström in the semifinals.

Emmrich and Siljeström defeated Olivier Charroin and Stéphane Robert 0–6, 6–4, [10–7] in the final.

Seeds

Draw

Draw

References
 Main Draw

Sparkassen Open - Doubles
Sport in Lower Saxony
2011 Doubles